Dermot Bannon (born ) is an Irish architect and television presenter best known for being the host of the Room to Improve television series.

Early life 
When he was around seven or eight years of age, Bannon and his family emigrated to Egypt as his father had taken a job in Cairo before subsequently returning to Ireland after a number of months of residing there.

When he was 18, he began studying in Hull School of Architecture in Kingston upon Hull, Yorkshire, England. Upon graduating, Bannon returned to Dublin and joined the Moloney O'Beirne Architects. In 2006, he had noticed an advertisement for a presenter for a new television series called House Hunters.

A year later, Bannon began to work on RTE's Room to Improve, with the latest season airing in 2023. A followup show, Room to Improve: Constructive Criticism was also aired in 2022. A new series, Dermot Bannon's Incredible Homes, was cut short in 2020 by the Covid-19 pandemic, and resumed airing in April 2022.

Bannon's father died in 2007 before Room to Improve had aired. In 2015, he released a book called Love Your Home.

References 

Living people
1972 births
Irish architects